Iva Janžurová (born 19 May 1941) is a Czech actress. She attended school in České Budějovice and in 1963, she graduated from the Faculty of Theatre at the Academy of Performing Arts in Prague. In 1964, she became the main member of Vinohrady Theatre and since 1988 has been a member of the National Theatre in Prague. She has appeared in many films, such as Což takhle dát si špenát, Marecek, Pass Me the Pen!, and the television series Hospital at the End of the City. In 1998 and 2002, she was awarded the Czech Lion for Best Actress.

Biography
Janžurová was born into a family of teachers. In 1959, she graduated from the pedagogical gymnasium in České Budějovice, but her interest in theatre led her to study acting afterward. Between 1959 and 1963, she studied under Vlasta Fabianová at DAMU in Prague. After graduating, she performed at the F. X. Šaldy Theatre in Liberec (1963–1964) and later found work at Vinohrady Theatre (1964–1987). She subsequently transferred to the National Theatre in 1988. Since 2012, she has been a guest at the Kalich Theatre.

Janžurová first appeared in film in the 1960s. After several episodic roles, director Karel Kachyňa cast her in his 1966 film, Coach to Vienna. She has since had numerous roles in film, television, and theatre. She was nominated for Best Actor at the Cannes Film Festival for her starring roles in Oil Lamps and Morgiana.

In 1968, she was married to Czech Television cinematographer Jan Eisner for half a year. Since then, her partner has been actor and director Stanislav Remunda, with whom she has two daughters, Theodora and Sabina Remundová. Both girls have performed with Janžurová in a travelling family theatre since the 1990s.

In 2013, she co-authored her autobiography, Včera, dnes a zítra, with writer Petr Macek.

Selected filmography

Film

Television

Awards and recognition
 Czech Lion for Best Actress – Co chytneš v žitě (1998)
 Alfréd Radok Award for Achievement of the Year (1998)
 Thalia Award for Best Actress in a Play – Šťastné dny (1998)
 Czech Lion for Best Actress – Výlet (2002)
 Crystal Globe for Outstanding Artistic Contribution to Czech Cinematography (2015)
 Medal of Merit II Degree (2016)
 Thalia Award for Lifetime Achievement (2021)

References

External links

 

1941 births
Living people
People from Žirovnice
Czech stage actresses
Czech film actresses
Czech television actresses
20th-century Czech actresses
21st-century Czech actresses
Academy of Performing Arts in Prague alumni
Recipients of Medal of Merit (Czech Republic)
Czech Lion Awards winners
Recipients of the Thalia Award